Panagia is a village on the island of Thasos in northern Greece. The village is a popular tourist spot due to its proximity to Potamia and the coastal resort of Skala Potamia and Skala Panagia, referred to in English as Golden Beach. Tourist sights include traditional Greek village buildings and water fountains from the freshwater stream with its source at Mount Ipsarion which run through the village.

References

External links
 Official municipality website

Populated places in Thasos